Dmitri Aleksandrovich Starodub (born 19 May 1995) is a Russian football player. He plays for FC SKA-Khabarovsk.

Club career
He made his Russian Premier League debut on 21 March 2015 for FC Arsenal Tula in a game against PFC CSKA Moscow.

References

External links
 

1995 births
Sportspeople from Vladivostok
Living people
Russian footballers
Association football midfielders
FC Dynamo Moscow reserves players
FC Arsenal Tula players
FC Veles Moscow players
FC SKA-Khabarovsk players
Russian Premier League players
Russian First League players
Russian Second League players